Porgoli-ye Sofla (also Romanized as Porgolī-ye Soflá) is a village in Jalalvand Rural District, Firuzabad District, Kermanshah County, Kermanshah Province, Iran. At the 2006 census, its population was 69, in 12 families.

References 

Populated places in Kermanshah County